The Man From the Rio Grande is a 1924 American silent film directed by Denver Dixon and starring Art Mix and Dorothy Lee. It premiered on November 30, 1924, in Indianapolis, Indiana.

Cast list
Art Mix as George Kesterson
Dorothy Lee

References

1924 films
American silent films
American black-and-white films
Films directed by Victor Adamson
1920s English-language films